() is the ninth chapter of the Quran. It contains 129 verses and is one of the last Medinan surahs.

It is believed by Muslims to have been revealed at the time of the Expedition of Tabuk in Medina in the 9th year of the Hijrah. The Sanaa manuscript preserves some verses, on parchment radiocarbon dated to between 578/44bh and 669/49ah.

It is the only Surah of the Quran that does not begin with Bismillah, the usual opening formula, In the name of Allah, the All-Merciful, the All-Compassionate. It deals with almost the same topics as those dealt with in Surat al-Anfal.

Summary
1-2 Four months’ immunity proclaimed to idolaters
3-5 After four months, all idolaters to be slain, with exception of those with whom treaties have been made
5-6 Ignorant idolators to be taught the religion of Islam, after which, if they repent, they are to be spared alive
7 No new league to be made with idolaters
8-10 Idolators are not to be trusted
11 Penitent idolators to be regarded as brethren
13-16 Muslims exhorted to fight against the truce-breakers of Makkah
17-18 All but Muslims to be excluded from the sacred temples
19 Abbás rebuked for his vainglory
20-22 The Muhájjirín assigned the first rank among Muslims—their reward
23-24 True believers to refuse friendship with nearest kin if they be infidels
25-27 The victory of Hunain due to God's help
28 Idolators excluded from the Kaabah
29 The Jews and Christians as well as idolators to be attacked (if they refuse to pay the Jizya tax)
30 Jews and Christians reproved for applying the epithet “Son of God” to Uzayr and Jesus 
31-32 They also worship their priests and monks
33 Islam superior to all other religions
34-35 Stingy Muslims likened to covetous monks—their punishment
36 Infidels may be attacked in sacred months
37 The sacred months not to be transferred
42 The lukewarm Muslims rebuked for wishing to stay at home
43 Muhammad rebuked for excusing some of these from going
44-46 Willingness to fight for Muhammad, a test of faith
47-50 Seditious Muslims rebuked
51-52 The sure reward of the faithful
53-55 God refuses the offerings of infidels and hypocrites
55 The wealth and prosperity of infidels a sign of their reprobation
56-57 Half-hearted Muslims reproved
58-59 Those who had spread libellous reports regarding Muhammad's use of alms rebuked
60 How alms should be expended
61-69 Grumblers and hypocrites threatened
70 They are warned by the example of the wicked in former ages
71-73 The faithful described—their rewards
74-75 Hypocrites denounced and threatened
76-79 Prosperity of infidels a prelude to their destruction
80 God shall scoff at the scoffers 
81 The defamers of the faithful shall never be forgiven
82-84 Punishment of the “stayers at home” 
85 Muhammad forbidden to pray at the grave of unbelievers and hypocrites
86-88 The Prophet not to wonder at the prosperity of the wicked
89-90 Reward of those who assist the Apostle in his wars
91 Hypocritical Arabs of the desert reproved
92-93 Who may lawfully remain at home in time of war
94-97 Other hypocrites reproved
98-99 The Baduín, the worst of hypocrites
100 Some of them true believers
101 The reward of the Ansars and Muhájjirín
102 The desert Arabs and some of the people of Madína reproved
103-106 The penitent confessors in Madína are pardoned
107 Others await God's decision in their case
108-111 Denunciation against those who built a Masjid in opposition to Muhammad and his faithful ones
112-113 True believers are sold to God
114 Muslims not to pray for idolatrous relatives
115 Why Abraham prayed for his idolatrous parents
116-118 God merciful to the faithful
119 The three recreant Ansars pardoned
120-122 The people of Madína rebuked for want of loyalty to Muhammad
123 Some believers excused from going to war
124 True believers to war against neighbouring infidels and hypocrisy
125-128 Reproof of those who doubt the revelations of God and Muhammad
129 The Apostle trusts in the help of God 

According to Zayd ibn Thabit, when the Qu'ran was first being compiled, he found the last verses of this Surah in the possession of Abu al-h al-Ansari and no one else. In another account, Ubay ibn Ka'b informed Zayd that Muhammad taught him the end of this sūrah and recited the same verses. Some, like Ibn Hazm, suggested that Abu Khuzayma was the only one to have the last verses in written form, as Zayd and others had memorized them. In a continuum of Surah Al-Anfal, this Surah additionally manages the issues of harmony and war and puts together the subject with respect to the Tabuk Expedition.The Significant Issues, Divine Laws and pieces of Guidance incorporated in this surah are as follows

 Policy guidelines for Muslims pertaining the mushriks.

 Instructions to participate in Jihad.

 Guidelines about hypocrisy, feeble faith, and carelessness.

 Battle of Tabuk.

 Foundation of a Dar-ul-Islam (an Islamic state).

 Stretching out the impact of Islam to abutting nations.

 Pulverizing the underhandedness of the hypocrites.

 Setting up the Muslims for a battle in the reason for Islam.

Name 
This Surah is known by two names - At-Taubah and Al-Bara'at. It is called At-Taubah in light of the fact that it articulates taubah (atonement) and informs about the conditions of its acceptance.(vv. 102. 118). The second name Bara'at (Release) is taken from the opening word of the Surah.

Omission of Bismillah 
Out of all 114 Surahs of the Quran this is the only one to which Bismillah is not prefixed. Among the explanations put forward for his not doing so, the most commonly accepted according to Unal is that, like the Islamic salutation, Peace be upon you, the expression, In the Name of God, the All-Merciful, the All-Compassionate conveys security and giving of quarter to those addressed. However, Surat at-Tawbah begins with an ultimatum to certain polytheists in Arabia. It deals, for the most part, with a re-evaluation of the relations with the polytheists who were frequently violating their agreements, the campaign to Tabuk, a disclosure of the intrigues of the hypocrites in Madinah(9:64-67, 101), the importance of jihad in God's cause(9:24), and relationships with the People of the Book.

Periods of revelation 
This Surah includes three Discourses :-

From opening up to the 37th ayat, the initial talk, was uncovered in Zil-Qa'adah A.H. 9. As the significance of the subject of the talk required its affirmation on the event of Hajj Muhammad dispatched Ali to follow Abu Bakr, who had just left for Makkah to lead the Pilgrims to the Ka'abah. He trained Ali to convey the talk before the representatives of the various clans of Arabia in order to advise them regarding the new policy guidelines pertinent to the mushriks.

Starting from ayat 38 up to 72nd ayat the subsequent talk was revealed during Rajab A.H. 9 or a little before this, when Muhammad was occupied with getting ready for the Campaign of Tabuk. The Believers were encouraged to take a dynamic part in Jihad, and the shirkers were seriously reproached for keeping down their riches and for wavering to forfeit their lives in the path for Allah due to their hypocrisy, powerless belief(iman) or carelessness.

The final section of ayaat 73rd to last, was uncovered on his return from the Campaign of Tabuk. There are a few pieces revealed in different events during the same time frame and were incorporated by Muhammad into the Surah as per instructions from Allah. This talk cautions the hypocrites of their malevolent deeds and censures those Believers who had remained behind in the Campaign of Tabuk. At that point in the wake of berating them, Allah exculpates those genuine Believers who had not partaken in the Jihad in the Way of Allah for one explanation or the other.

Exegesis

Verses 9:2 - 9:6

The Quran, chapter 9 (At-Tawba), verses 2–6:

 is termed as the Sword Verse. The journalist Arun Shourie has criticized this and many other verses from the Quran contending that the Sunnah and the Hadith are equally evocative in their support of Jihad. Many mainstream Islamic scholars, however, assert that this verse relates to a very specific event in early Islamic history i.e. the covenant that was made and consecutively broken by the polytheist tribes of Mecca:74-91. Some think they very easily bypass the fact that Quran is often quoted by Islamic scholars to be the book perfect for all times and all places and all humans, and if it is so, its verses never need a historical context at all. On the other hand, even if the Quran are not supposed to have a historic contextual explanation the context provided (such as the unfaithfulness in pacts and treatises) are mentioned in the previous verses, thus a part of the Quran itself instead of an "out-world" context relations. According to Asma Afsaruddin, citing various early exegetes' opinions regarding the Arab polytheists, the consensus among the earliest commentators has been that this does not translate into indiscriminate killing.:88-89

Similarly, Western Islam-scholar Rudolph F. Peters also asserts that indiscriminate killing is not supported in this verse.

Verse 9:29

At-Tawbah also contains: 

Al-Rāzī (d. 606/1210), on this occasion quoted an early exegetical authority, Abū Rawq (d. 140/757), who explained that this verse was not a unilateral condemnation of all Jews and Christians, but those "who do not heed the prescriptions contained in the Torah and the Gospel, respectively". Similarly Al-Qurṭubī (d. 671/1273) "did not read into Qurān 9:29 a wholesale denunciation of the People of the Book as an undifferentiated collectivity".:278 Modern Muslim scholars like Muhammad Abduh shared similar views, agreeing that this verse was revealed on the occasion of the military campaign in Tabuk, and this verse specifically deals with the People of the Book", and also that "the only kind of legitimate war on which there is unanimity among Muslim scholars is the defensive war when proclaimed by the Imām in the event of an attack upon Muslim territory". The Grand Imam of al-Azhar from 1935 to 1945, Mustafa Al-Maraghi, notes that 9:29 means: "fight those mentioned when the conditions which necessitate fighting are present, namely, aggression against you or your country, oppression and persecution against you on account of your faith, or threatening your safety and security, as was committed against you by the Byzantines, which was what led to Tabuk."

Verse 9:103
In Kitab al-Kafi, Ja'far al-Sadiq has narrated that Imams are not needy to what people own but rather collect religious tax on accord that Allah said, "Take from their wealth (religious tax) and charity by which you purify them and cause them to increase and invoke blessings upon them." Therefore, it is the people who need that the Imam accepts from them.

Battle of Badr 
Some parts of the chapter are believed to be speaking about the help of Allah by sending the invisible army of war, particularly mentioning the battle of Badr. According to Muhammad Sulaiman al-Ashqar from Islamic University of Madinah, who quoted several contemporary and classical scholars, the invisible army here were the Angels army consisted of Gabriel, Michael, Raphael  and thousands of best angels from third level of sky, all came to the battle of Badr by impersonating appearance of Zubayr ibn al-Awwam, companion of Muhammad. are deemed as his other personal virtue and venerable status according to Islamic belief. Meanwhile, Mahdi Rizqullah has compiled the commentary from classical Islamic scholars, that the verse narration about the angels attendance in the battle were also supported by hadiths from hadith collection from Muslim ibn Hajjaj, Ahmad ibn Hanbal, and the also from Quranic historiography work by Ibn Kathir. Muhammad Nasiruddin al-Albani gave commentary of another supportive narration from al-Baihaqi and Ibn Ishaq, through various hadith narration chains about the testimony from several different sahabah. This included the narration of Abbas ibn Abd al-Muttalib who at that time fought on the side of Qurayshite polytheist, who testified that he has been taken captive on the aftermath of the battle by a horse rider whom he did not recognize at all from Muslims rank. According to the hadith authority from Ahmad ibn Hanbal, The captor of Abbas were confirmed by Muhammad as one of the angel who helped the Muslims during this battle.

Sanaa manuscript folio 22, Q9:122-129
Verses 122-129 are preserved in Folio 22 of the Sanaa manuscript. The sequence of Sanaa 1 chapters do not follow any other known quranic order and folio 22 is shared with Chapter 19 (Mary). Saudi-based experts in Quranic history emphasize that while Muhammad was alive, Quranic texts did not follow any standard sequence of surahs.

Hadith

The first and foremost exegesis/tafsir of the Qur'an is found in hadith of Muhammad. Ḥadīth (حديث) is literally "speech" or "report", that is a recorded saying or tradition of Muhammad validated by isnad; with Sirah Rasul Allah these comprise the sunnah and reveal shariah. According to Aishah, the life of Muhammad was practical implementation of Qur'an. Therefore, higher count of hadith elevates the importance of the pertinent surah from a certain perspective. This surah was held in special esteem in hadith, which can be observed by these related narratives.

 Abu Ishaq said that he heard al-Bara' b. 'Azib (Allah be pleased with him) say: The last complete sura revealed (in the Holy Qur'an) is Sura At-Tawbah (i e. al-Bara'at, ix.), and the last verse revealed is that pertaining to Kalala.

 Narrated Sa'id ibn Jubayr: I asked Ibn `Abbas about Surat At-Tawbah, and he said, "Surat Al-Tauba? It is exposure (of all the evils of the infidels and the hypocrites). And it continued revealing (that the oft-repeated expression): '...and of them ...and of them.' till they started thinking that none would be left unmentioned therein." I said, "What about) SuratAl-Anfal?" He replied, "Surat Al-Anfal was revealed in connection with the Battle of Badr." I said, "(What about) Surat Al-Hashr?" He replied, "It was revealed in connection with Banu Nadir."

 Narrated Zayd ibn Thabit Al-Ansari: who was one of those who used to write the Divine Revelation: Abu Bakr sent for me after the (heavy) casualties among the warriors (of the battle) of Yamama (where a great number of Qurra' were killed). `Umar was present with Abu Bakr who said, `Umar has come to me and said, The people have suffered heavy casualties on the day of (the battle of) Yamama, and I am afraid that there will be more casualties among the Qurra' (those who know the Qur'an by heart) at other battle-fields, whereby a large part of the Qur'an may be lost, unless you collect it. And I am of the opinion that you should collect the Qur'an." Abu Bakr added, "I said to `Umar, 'How can I do something which Allah's Apostle has not done?' `Umar said (to me), 'By Allah, it is (really) a good thing.' So `Umar kept on pressing, trying to persuade me to accept his proposal, till Allah opened my bosom for it and I had the same opinion as `Umar." (Zaid bin Thabit added:) `Umar was sitting with him (Abu Bakr) and was not speaking. me). "You are a wise young man and we do not suspect you (of telling lies or of forgetfulness): and you used to write the Divine Inspiration for Allah's Messenger. Therefore, look for the Qur'an and collect it (in one manuscript). " By Allah, if he (Abu Bakr) had ordered me to shift one of the mountains (from its place) it would not have been harder for me than what he had ordered me concerning the collection of the Qur'an. I said to both of them, "How dare you do a thing which the Prophet has not done?" Abu Bakr said, "By Allah, it is (really) a good thing. So I kept on arguing with him about it till Allah opened my bosom for that which He had opened the bosoms of Abu Bakr and `Umar. So I started locating Qur'anic material and collecting it from parchments, scapula, leaf-stalks of date palms and from the memories of men (who knew it by heart). I found with Khuza`ima two Verses of Surat At-Tawbah which I had not found with anybody else, (and they were):-- "Verily there has come to you an Apostle (Muhammad) from amongst yourselves. It grieves him that you should receive any injury or difficulty He (Muhammad) is ardently anxious over you (to be rightly guided)" (9.128) The manuscript on which the Qur'an was collected, remained with Abu Bakr until Allah took him unto Him, and then with `Umar till Allah took him unto Him, and finally it remained with Hafsa, `Umar's daughter.

Placement and coherence with other surahs
The idea of textual relation between the verses of a chapter has been discussed under various titles such as nazm and munasabah in non-English literature and coherence, text relations, intertextuality, and unity in English literature. Hamiduddin Farahi, an Islamic scholar of the Indian subcontinent, is known for his work on the concept of nazm, or coherence, in the Quran. Fakhruddin al-Razi (died 1209 CE),  Zarkashi (died 1392) and several other classical as well as contemporary Quranic scholars have contributed to the studies. The entire Qur'an thus emerges as a well-connected and systematic book. Each division has a distinct theme. Topics within a division are more or less in the order of revelation. Within each division, each member of the pair complements the other in various ways. The seven divisions are as follows:

See also
 Repentance in Islam

Appendix

Notes

References

Bibliography

External links
Quran 9 Clear Quran translation

Tawba
Jihad
At-Tawba